Raymond Leslie "Ray" Evans (born 20 September 1949) is an English former footballer who played in the position of full back in England and the United States. He played for Tottenham Hotspur, Millwall, Fulham and Stoke City.

Career
Evans was born in Edmonton, London and joined Tottenham Hotspur as an apprentice in May 1965, and signed as a full professional in 1967, making his league debut in March 1969 at Arsenal. He made 181 appearances including four as substitute in all competitions for the club between 1969–1974 and scored two goals. Evans featured in both legs of the 1974 UEFA Cup Final against Feyenoord with Spurs losing 4–2 on aggregate.

He joined Millwall for a fee of £35,000 in January 1975. He helped the Lions win promotion to the Second Division in 1975–76 and made 91 appearances for the club in three seasons. During the summer of 1977, Evans played for the St. Louis Stars of the North American Soccer League. He transferred to Fulham in March 1977 where he played 91 for the Craven Cottage side as they posted three season of mid-table in the Second Division. In 1978, he returned to the United States where he played for the California Surf. He was selected for the First Team All-Star team in 1978. In August 1979 he return to England and signed for Stoke City. He played 44 times for Stoke in 1979–80 scoring a penalty against Aston Villa. He played in 36 matches in 1980–81 and 26 times in 1981–82. He returned to the United States after making 106 appearances for the Potters.

In 1982, he moved permanently to the United States when he signed with the Seattle Sounders for two seasons. In the autumn of 1983, he moved to the newly established Tacoma Stars of the Major Indoor Soccer League. He would play three seasons for Tacoma before announcing his retirement in May 1986. In 1989, he came out of retirement to play one season in the Western Soccer Alliance with the Seattle Storm.

Coaching career
While with the Tacoma Stars, Evans also served as an assistant coach. He is now the head coach of the Columbia Basin College, Washington, United States

Career statistics
Source:

Honours
 Tottenham Hotspur
 UEFA Cup winner: 1971-72
 UEFA Cup runner-up: 1973-74

 Millwall
 Football League Third Division third-place promotion: 1975–76

References

External links
 
 NASL/MISL stats
 Ray Evans

1949 births
Living people
Footballers from Edmonton, London
California Surf players
English footballers
English expatriate footballers
Seattle Storm (soccer) players
Fulham F.C. players
Major Indoor Soccer League (1978–1992) players
Millwall F.C. players
North American Soccer League (1968–1984) players
St. Louis Stars (soccer) players
Seattle Sounders (1974–1983) players
Stoke City F.C. players
English Football League players
Tacoma Stars players
Tottenham Hotspur F.C. players
Western Soccer Alliance players
UEFA Cup winning players
Association football defenders
English expatriate sportspeople in the United States
Expatriate soccer players in the United States